Sektzia Ness Ziona (Sektziyat Kaduregel Nes Tziona, lit. Football Section Ness Ziona) are a football club from the Israeli city of Ness Ziona. They currently play in the Israeli Premier League, the top tier of Israeli football. Home matches were previously played at the Ness Ziona Stadium. Upon their promotion to the Israeli Premier League for the 2019–20 season, the club moved its home matches to the HaMoshava Stadium in Petah Tikva, Israel.

History
The club was founded as F.S. Nes Ziona in 1955, following a merger of the local football clubs in Ness Ziona, Israel. In their second season of existence they were promoted from Liga Gimel to Liga Bet. In the 1962–63 season, they won Liga Bet South B division and were promoted to Liga Alef. Three season later, in the 1965–66 season, they won Liga Alef South division and were promoted to Liga Leumit, then the top division. The 1966–68 season was played over two years and involved a 4-round (60 match) competition. However, the club managed only eight wins and were relegated. This was to be their only appearance in the top division to date.

During the mid-1990s the club played in Liga Artzit, then the second tier. In the 1998–99 season the club finished second from bottom and had four points deducted for breaking budget rules. They were due to be relegated to the third tier, but were demoted to the fourth tier, Liga Alef, as their budget for the 1999–2000 season was not approved by the Israel Football Association. After finishing bottom of Liga Alef in 2000–01, they folded.

In the 2004–05 season, Liga Bet club from Ness Ziona, Maccabi Ben Zvi, became Ironi Ness Ziona or Maccabi Ben Zvi\Ironi, as recognized by the Israel Football Association. Ironi finished as runners-up to Hapoel Arad, and promoted to Liga Alef after successful promotion play-offs against Hapoel Azor and Beitar Giv'at Ze'ev. Ironi Ness Ziona was renamed in the summer of 2005, becoming Sektzia Ness Ziona (an alternative Hebrew transliteration for "Section"), and the club was reborn. at the end of the 2005–06 season, the club won Liga Alef South and promotion to Liga Artzit.

The club won Liga Artzit in 2008–09, the last season of Liga Artzit as the third tier of Israeli football, and was promoted to Liga Leumit. In the 2012–13 season, the club finished second bottom in Liga Leumit and relegated to Liga Alef, where they play today. After a few seasons in Liga Leumit, they became 2nd league champions in 2018-19, and started in the Israel Premier League in 2019–20.

Current squad

Honours
Second tier (1):
1965–66 Liga Alef
Third tier (5):
1960–61 Liga Bet
1962–63 Liga Bet
1972–73 Liga Bet
1990–91 Liga Alef
2008–09 Liga Artzit
Fourth tier (3):
1956–57 Liga Gimel
1989–90 Liga Bet
2005–06 Liga Alef

Former notable managers

 Rafi Cohen (born 1965)

See also
Ness Ziona Stadium
HaMoshava Stadium

References

External links
 Sektzia Ness Ziona The Israel Football Association 

 
Football clubs in Israel
Sport in Ness Ziona
Association football clubs established in 1955
Association football clubs established in 2005
Association football clubs disestablished in 2001
1955 establishments in Israel
2005 establishments in Israel
2001 disestablishments in Israel